This is a non-comprehensive list of short stories with significant science fiction elements.

Award winning short stories 
The two main awards given in American science fiction are the Hugos and the Nebulas. Complete lists of the short stories that won these awards are at Hugo Award for Best Short Story and Nebula Award for Best Short Story.

See also
 The Science Fiction Hall of Fame Volume One, 1929-1964, the best short stories from before the awarding of the Nebulas.

References

 
Science Fiction Short Stories
Science fiction short stories